Jamalabad is a fort in Karnataka, India. 

It could also be:

 Jamalabad Gojal, Pakistan

Jamalabad or Jemalabad may also refer to places in Iran:

Ardabil Province
Jamalabad, Ardabil, a village in Meshgin Shahr County

Bushehr Province
Jamalabad, Bushehr

Chaharmahal and Bakhtiari Province
Jamalabad, Chaharmahal and Bakhtiari, a village in Kuhrang County

East Azerbaijan Province
Jamalabad, Maragheh, a village in Maragheh County
Jamalabad, Meyaneh, a village in Meyaneh County
Jamalabad, Sarab, a village in Sarab County

Fars Province
Jamalabad, Arsanjan, a village in Arsanjan County
Jamalabad, Bavanat, a village in Bavanat County
Jamalabad, Sarchehan, a village in Bavanat County
Jamalabad, Lamerd, a village in Lamerd County
Jamalabad, Marvdasht, a village in Marvdasht County
Jamalabad, Shiraz, a village in Shiraz County

Gilan Province
Jamalabad-e Hallaj, a village in Rudbar County
Jamalabad-e Kuseh, a village in Rudbar County
Jamalabad-e Nezamivand, a village in Rudbar County

Isfahan Province

Kerman Province
Jamalabad, Anbarabad, a village in Anbarabad County
Jamalabad, Baft, a village in Baft County
Jamalabad, Mahan, a village in Kerman County
Jamalabad, Rudbar-e Jonubi, a village in Rudbar-e Jonubi County

Khuzestan Province
Jamalabad, Khuzestan

Markazi Province
Jamalabad, Arak, Markazi Province
Jamalabad, Mahallat, Markazi Province
Jamalabad, Shazand, Markazi Province

Razavi Khorasan Province
Jamalabad, Razavi Khorasan

Sistan and Baluchestan Province
Jamalabad, Sistan and Baluchestan

Tehran Province
Jamalabad, Tehran, a village in Pakdasht County, Tehran Province, Iran
Jamalabad Rural District, an administrative subdivision of Pakdasht County, Tehran Province, Iran

West Azerbaijan Province
Jamalabad, Poldasht, a village in Poldasht County
Jamalabad, Salmas, a village in Salmas County
Jamalabad, Urmia, a village in Urmia County

Yazd Province
Jamalabad, Yazd, a village in Saduq County

See also
Jamilabad (disambiguation)